Apisa rendalli is a moth of the  family Erebidae. It was described by Rothschild in 1910. It is found in the Democratic Republic of Congo, Ghana and Malawi.

References

Moths described in 1910
Syntomini
Lepidoptera of Malawi
Erebid moths of Africa
Lepidoptera of the Democratic Republic of the Congo
Lepidoptera of West Africa